A hyaline substance is one with a glassy appearance.

Histopathology
Hyaline cartilage is named after its glassy appearance on fresh gross pathology. On light microscopy of H&E stained slides, the extracellular matrix of hyaline cartilage looks homogeneously pink, and the term "hyaline" is used to describe similarly homogeneously pink material besides the cartilage. Hyaline material is usually acellular and proteinaceous. For example, arterial hyaline is seen in aging, high blood pressure, diabetes mellitus and in association with some drugs (e.g. calcineurin inhibitors). It is bright pink with PAS staining.

Ichthyology and entomology

In ichthyology and entomology, hyaline  denotes a colorless, transparent substance, such as unpigmented fins of fishes or clear insect wings.

Botany
In botany hyaline refers to thin and translucent plant parts, such as the margins of some sepals, bracts and leaves.

See also
Hyaline arteriolosclerosis
Hyaloid canal, which passes through the eye
Hyalopilitic
Hyaloserositis
Infant respiratory distress syndrome, previously known as hyaline membrane disease

References

Taber's Cyclopedic Medical Dictionary, 19th Edition. Donald Venes ed. 1997 F.A. Davis. Page 1008.

Histopathology
Fungal morphology and anatomy